The Autostrada A24, or Autostrada dei Parchi (“Parks Motorway”), is a motorway connecting Rome to  Teramo. Starting at the Grande Raccordo Anulare (GRA - the Rome orbital motorway), the A24 runs broadly north-east past L'Aquila and through a 10 km tunnel under the Gran Sasso before reaching Teramo.

It is constructed in an almost completely hilly and mountainous territory with a complex orography. For this reason, the motorway required the adoption of daring civil engineering solutions, with extensive stretches utilising viaducts and 42 tunnels (four of which are longer than 4 km) including the double tunnel of the Gran Sasso, whose length (10.174 km for the northern tunnel, 10.175 km the southern) made it the longest double-tube road tunnel in Europe, as well as the longest road tunnel in Italy entirely in the national territory.

First planned in 1973 to connect Lazio and Abruzzo as well as the Autostrada del Sole and the Autostrada Adriatica, the route currently finishes at Teramo, with the remainder of the distance to the Adriatic Sea still under construction. The highway includes two long tunnels under the Gran Sasso massif, running roughly on a south west/north east axis, with each tunnel just over 6.3 miles in length. A third tunnel, dug adjacent to the two highway tunnels, houses the Laboratori Nazionali del Gran Sasso (National Laboratories of the Gran Sasso), the largest underground particle physics laboratory in the world.

Together with the A25, it fulfilled the need to provide a fast and reliable connection between the capital and the central-eastern regions of the peninsula; until then, the natural subdivision imposed by the highest peaks of the Apennines had made travel between the two seas difficult, slow and treacherous. The A24 reduced the isolation of Abruzzo from the Tyrrhenian regions, and together with the A25 became the main link between the Tyrrhenian and the Adriatic in central Italy. Until its completion, communications took place mainly via Salaria, Flaminia and Tiburtina Valeria. Due to the particular infrastructure in place (viaducts and tunnels), the hilly-mountain environment and necessary maintenance, it has one of the highest tolls of motorways in Italy.
,

The route is currently managed by Strada dei Parchi S.p.A..

Route

See also 
 Autostrada A25 (Italy)
 A24

References

External links
Strada dei Parchi S.p.A. (in Italian)

A24
Transport in Abruzzo
Transport in Lazio